Guyjeh Qaleh-ye Olya (also Romanized as Gūyjeh Qal‘eh-ye ‘Olyā; also known as Gowjeh Qal‘eh-ye ‘Olyā and) is a village in Quri Chay-ye Gharbi Rural District, Saraju District, Maragheh County, East Azerbaijan Province, Iran. At the 2006 census, its population was 71, in 14 families.

References 

Towns and villages in Maragheh County